In Greek mythology, Melanippe (Ancient Greek: Μελανίππη, "black mare"), also known as Arne or Antiopa, was the daughter of Aeolus and the precedent Melanippe (or else daughter of Hippotes or of Desmontes). She was the mother by Poseidon, of the twins Aeolus (Hellen) and Boeotus.

Mythology 
There are various accounts of what happened to Melanippe after the birth of her sons. In one version, when her father discovered her pregnancy, he handed her over to a man from Metapontium, who was childless and adopted her sons as his own. When the boys grew up, a civil war began in Metapontium and they seized the kingship. They also killed Autolyte, their adoptive father's wife, for having mistreated their natural mother. Strabo cites two other accounts, in which Melanippe was said to have been handed over either to Metabus or to Dius.

In another version of Melanippe's story, when her father discovered that she had given birth to twins, he blinded her, shut her in a prison and ordered that the babies be exposed. However, they were suckled by a cow and survived. They were subsequently rescued by shepherds, who later gave them to Theano, wife of King Metapontus of Icaria, as she was looking for a baby to present to her husband as her own, fearing that he would expel her if she bore him no children. Later, however, she did give birth to two sons, but Metapontus was already more fond of the sons of Melanippe. So when they grew up, Theano instructed her natural sons to kill Aeolus and Boeotus during hunt. The two, however, defended themselves and, with the aid of Poseidon, killed Theano's sons. She then committed suicide and the brothers fled to the shepherds who had found them. Having found out about their true descent from Poseidon, they released their natural mother Melanippe from prison, and Poseidon restored her sight.

Two tragedies by Euripides, Melanippe The Prisoner and Melanippe The Philosopher, were dedicated to this character.

Notes

References 

 Diodorus Siculus, The Library of History translated by Charles Henry Oldfather. Twelve volumes. Loeb Classical Library. Cambridge, Massachusetts: Harvard University Press; London: William Heinemann, Ltd. 1989. Vol. 3. Books 4.59–8. Online version at Bill Thayer's Web Site
 Diodorus Siculus, Bibliotheca Historica. Vol 1-2. Immanel Bekker. Ludwig Dindorf. Friedrich Vogel. in aedibus B. G. Teubneri. Leipzig. 1888-1890. Greek text available at the Perseus Digital Library.
 Gaius Julius Hyginus, Fabulae from The Myths of Hyginus translated and edited by Mary Grant. University of Kansas Publications in Humanistic Studies. Online version at the Topos Text Project.
 Strabo, The Geography of Strabo. Edition by H.L. Jones. Cambridge, Mass.: Harvard University Press; London: William Heinemann, Ltd. 1924. Online version at the Perseus Digital Library.
 Strabo, Geographica edited by A. Meineke. Leipzig: Teubner. 1877. Greek text available at the Perseus Digital Library.

Princesses in Greek mythology
Thessalian characters in Greek mythology
Thessalian mythology